Company of Strangers is the eleventh studio album by the English blues rock band Bad Company, and their first with lead singer Robert Hart (in place of Brian Howe who had replaced Paul Rodgers in 1986). The album was released in June 1995.  To date, it is the band's latest studio album of all-new material.

Track listing

Personnel
Bad Company
 Robert Hart −  vocals
 Mick Ralphs − lead guitar, piano
 Dave Colwell − rhythm guitar 
 Rick Wills − bass
 Simon Kirke − drums
with:
 Mel Collins − saxophone
Strings arranged and conducted by Michael Kamen

References

1995 albums
Bad Company albums
East West Records albums